The Faust House is a historic house at 114 Richmond Hill in West Helena, Arkansas.  It is a single-story wood-frame structure, finished in brick.   It has porch extending across its entire front facade, supported by brick columns and spandrels, and topped by a ceramic tile roof.  The house is locally significant as one of the finest Spanish Mission style houses in West Helena.

The house was listed on the National Register of Historic Places in 1996.

See also
National Register of Historic Places listings in Phillips County, Arkansas

References

Houses on the National Register of Historic Places in Arkansas
Mission Revival architecture in Arkansas
Houses completed in 1924
Houses in Phillips County, Arkansas
National Register of Historic Places in Phillips County, Arkansas